Koyulhisar is a town and a district of Sivas Province of Turkey. The mayor is Osman Epsileli (MHP).

History 
The ancient city of Nicopolis in Armenia (v.; Νικόπολις in ancient Greek) stood at this place and rose to Metropolis of Roman Lesser Armenia.
 
Historically, it has also been known as Koyluhisar and Koyunlu Hisar.
This name seemingly hails from the Latin colonia (Roman colony), as it was also the nearby site of Colonia in Armenia, which became important enough to be a suffragan in the Late Roman Province of Armenia Prima, but faded like most in Asia Minor.

References 

Populated places in Sivas Province
Districts of Sivas Province